The Premier League of Volleyball of Bosnia and Herzegovina is the top volleyball league in Bosnia and Herzegovina.

Premier volleyball league for men

2020-21 Season participants
The following 10 clubs compete in the Volleyball Premier League during the 2020-21 season.

Champions  

2022 - Kakanj
2021 - Mladost
2019 - Mladost
2018 - Mladost
2017 - Mladost
2016 - Mladost
2015 - Mladost (2nd Gacko, 3rd Kakanj )
2014 - Mladost (2nd Jedinstvo, 3rd Modriča Optima)
2013 - Kakanj (2nd Jedinstvo, 3rd Mladost)
2012 - Kakanj (2nd Mladost, 3rd Jedinstvo)
2011 - Kakanj (2nd Jedinstvo, 3rd Modriča Optima)
2010 - Kakanj (2nd Napredak, 3rd Radnik Bijeljina)
2009 - Kakanj (2nd Napredak, 3rd Bosna Sarajevo)
2008 - Kakanj (2nd Modriča Optima, 3rd Napredak)
2007 - Napredak
2006 - Kakanj
2005 - Kakanj
2004 - Kakanj
2003 - Kakanj
2002 - Napredak
2001 - Kakanj
2000 - Kakanj
1999 - Jedinstvo
1998 - Sinops
1997 - Sinops
1996 - Bihać
1995 - Bihać
1994 - Gradina

Cup winners 

2022 - Mladost
2021 - Mladost
2020 - Not played
2019 - Mladost
2018 - Mladost
2017 - Mladost
2016 - Mladost
2015 - Mladost
2014 - Mladost
2013 - Jedinstvo
2012 - Kakanj
2011 - Kakanj
2010 - Kakanj
2009 - Kakanj
2008 - Kakanj
2007 - Modriča-Optima
2006 - Kakanj
2005 - Bosna Sarajevo
2004 - Kakanj
2003 - Kakanj
2002 - Kakanj
2001 - Kakanj
2000 - Jedinstvo
1999 - Sinops
1998 - Sinops
1997 - Kakanj
1996 - Kakanj
1995 - Kakanj
1994 - Kakanj

Premier volleyball league for women

2020-21 Season participants
The following 10 clubs compete in the Volleyball Premier League during the 2020-21 season.

Champions

2022 Bimal-Jedinstvo
2021 
2020 
2019 Bimal-Jedinstvo
2018 Bimal-Jedinstvo
2017 Bimal-Jedinstvo
2016 Bimal-Jedinstvo
2015 Bimal-Jedinstvo
2014 Bimal-Jedinstvo
2013 Jedinstvo
2012 Jedinstvo
2011 Jedinstvo
2010 Jedinstvo
2009 Jedinstvo
2008 Jedinstvo
2007 Jedinstvo-Mobis
2006 Jelovica

Cup winners 

2019 Bimal-Jedinstvo
2018 Bimal-Jedinstvo
2017 Bimal-Jedinstvo
2016 Bimal-Jedinstvo
2015 Bimal-Jedinstvo
2014 Gacko
2013 Jedinstvo
2012 Kula
2011 Jedinstvo
2010 Jedinstvo
2009 Jedinstvo
2008 Jedinstvo
2007 Jedinstvo-Mobis
2006 Jelovica

References

Bosnia and Herzegovina
Bosnia and Herzegovina
Volleyball in Bosnia and Herzegovina
Vol
Sports leagues established in 1994